The 1977 Australian Film Awards ceremony, presented by the Australian Film Institute (AFI), honoured the best Australian films of 1976 on 21 September 1977 at Regent Theatre, in Sydney, New South Wales. It was televised on ABC. Actors Keir Dullea and
Karen Black, and former Australian Prime Minister John Gorton hosted the show.

Don's Party won six awards including Best Direction and Best Actress. Other winners were The Picture Show Man with four awards, and Storm Boy with two awards including Best Film and the Jury Prize. Charles Chauvel was posthumously awarded the Raymond Longford Award.

Ceremony
The ceremony was held on 21 September 1977 at Regent Theatre, in Sydney, New South Wales. It was hosted by actors Keir Dullea and Karen Black, and former Australian Prime Minister John Gorton. Films were nominated for awards in thirteen categories, marking the first time the awards were presented competitively and not as a film prize like previous years, with the exception of the non-feature film categories. The Awards were televised on ABC.

Winners and nominees
The Australian Film Institute (AFI) presented awards across eighteen categories. Three new award categories were presented for Best Achievement in Sound, Best Costume Design and Best Art Direction, and the award for Best Original Music Score was reinstated after it had not been given since 1973. The recipients of the peer voted feature-film awards included the film Storm Boy, for Best Film; Bruce Beresford for Best Direction, for Don's Party; John Meillon for Best Actor, for The Fourth Wish; and Pat Bishop for Best Actress, for Don's Party. Charles Chauvel received the Raymond Longford Award posthumously for his contribution to Australian screen culture and environment, and was presented to his wife Elsa Chauvel. Storm Boy was nominated for nine awards but only received two; and Don's Party won five of the six awards it was nominated for, winning the most awards at the ceremony. Non-feature films were presented with a gold, silver or bronze prize, or an honourable mention, and the awards were determined by a jury. The Love Letters from Teralba Road received a gold and silver prize, and a special award for creativity.

Peer voted awards

Jury voted prizes

Special awards
Raymond Longford Award
Charles Chauvel
Jedda Award
Storm Boy – Matt Carroll
Creativity award
Tom Cowan – Journey Among Women
Stephen Wallace – The Love Letters from Teralba Road
Alexander Stitt – Rover
Adrian Ussher – Phone Home To...
Macro Photography
Densey Clyde, Jim Frazier – Garden Jungle

See also
AACTA Awards

References

Further reading

External links
The Australian Academy of Cinema and Television Arts Official website

Film
A
1977 in Australian cinema